Samuel Elsworth Cottam (7 August 1863 – 30 March 1943) was an English poet and Anglican priest.

Biography
Cottam was born in Upper Broughton, Salford, in 1863. He graduated from Exeter College, Oxford, in 1885, where he was a friend of Edwin Emmanuel Bradford. He was a lifelong Anglo-Catholic, unlike Bradford who later became a Modernist. Cottam and Bradford were co-Chaplains of St George's Anglican Church in Paris, France. He was later incumbent at Wootton, Vale of White Horse, where John Betjeman and W. H. Auden went to see him celebrate sung mass.

Will
In his will Cottam left trust funds for "the purchase of objects of beauty for the furtherance of religion in ancient gothic churches." This trust is now administered by the Friends of Friendless Churches and has been used to benefit many dozens of churches in England and Wales, by the addition of furnishings, stained glass and bells.

Bibliography

See also
 Uranian poetry

References

  [Death date, 30 March 1943.]
 

1863 births
1943 deaths
20th-century English male writers
20th-century English Anglican priests
20th-century English poets
Alumni of Exeter College, Oxford
Anglican chaplains
Anglican poets
Anglo-Catholic clergy
Church of England priests
English Anglo-Catholics
English chaplains
English male non-fiction writers
English male poets
British gay writers
LGBT Anglican clergy
English LGBT poets
writers from Oxford
People from Salford